Vilhjálmsson is a surname of Icelandic origin, meaning son of Vilhjálmur (William or Wilhelm). In Icelandic names, the name is not strictly a surname, but a patronymic. The name refers to:

Einar Vilhjálmsson (born 1960), Icelandic Olympic javelin thrower
Matthías Vilhjálmsson (born 1987), Icelandic footballer
Sigmar Vilhjálmsson (born 1977), Icelandic television host
Thor Vilhjálmsson (born 1925), Icelandic novelist, poet, playwright, and translator
Vilhjálmur Þ. Vilhjálmsson (born 1946), Icelandic politician; Mayor of Reykjavík 2006–07
Thór Vilhjálmsson, judge of ECtHR

See also
Vilhjálmsdóttir

Patronymic surnames